Dundee is a community in Restigouche County, New Brunswick, Canada. It is named after Dundee in Scotland.

History

Notable people

See also
List of communities in New Brunswick

References
 

Communities in Restigouche County, New Brunswick
Local service districts of Restigouche County, New Brunswick